Živko M. Andrijašević  (born 24 February 1967, Bar, Montenegro) is a Montenegrin historian and writer. He is known for writing the standard historical dictionary of Montenegro.

Works
Pokrštavanje Muslimana 1913 godine (co-author with Zoran Stanojević), Published: Podgorica: Almanah, 2003.
History of Montenegro: From Ancient Times to 2003; Part one Živko M. Andrijašević, part two Šerbo Rastoder. Published: Podgorica: Diaspora center, 2006.
Istorijski Leksikon Crne Gore  (Historical Dictionary of Montenegro)(co-author, co-editor), Published: 2006 
Istorijski Leksikon Crne Gore: A-Crn   
Istorijski Leksikon Crne Gore: ?-?
Istorijski Leksikon Crne Gore: Per-Ž

Footnotes

Montenegrin historians
Montenegrin writers
Montenegrin male writers
Living people
1967 births